The 28th International 500-Mile Sweepstakes Race was held at the Indianapolis Motor Speedway on May 30, 1940. The winner was Wilbur Shaw in the same Maserati 8CTF  he had driven to victory in 1939.  Shaw became the first driver in the history of the race to win in consecutive years. It also marked Shaw's third win in four years, making him the second three-time winner of the race. Shaw's average speed was 114.277 mph, slowed by rain which caused the last 50 laps to be run under caution. Shaw took home $31,875 in prize winnings, plus additional prizes that included a car and a refrigerator.

Fourth place finisher Ted Horn was flagged due to the rain shower after completing only 199 laps - one lap short of the full distance. This marked the only blemish on his noteworthy record of nine consecutive races completing every lap. He eventually completed 1,799 out of a possible 1,800 laps from 1936 to 1948.

The top four starting positions finished in the top four places, albeit in shuffled order.

Results

Note: The race was run under caution from lap 150 to 200 due to rain.

Alternates
First alternate: Tony Willman

Failed to qualify
George Bailey (#56) - Fatal accident
Henry Banks (#39)
Shorty Cantlon (#24) - Replaced by Babe Stapp
Wesley Crawford (#62)
Port DeFraties  (#51)
René Dreyfus  (#22) - drove two stints of relief for René Le Bègue during the race
Louis Durant  (#12)
Ira Hall (#47)
Bill Lipscomb  (#57)
Louis Unser  - Passed driver's test
Lou Webb  (#37)
Freddy Winnai (#59)

See also
 1940 AAA Championship Car season

References

Indianapolis 500 races
Indianapolis 500
Indianapolis 500
1940 in American motorsport
May 1940 sports events